A Lan Zayar is a 2011 Burmese romantic-comedy film, directed by Nyi Nyi Htun Lwin starring Thu Htoo San, Moe Aung Yin, Moe Hay Ko, Thinzar Wint Kyaw, Nan Su Yati Soe and Melody.

Cast
Thu Htoo San
Moe Aung Yin
Moe Hay Ko
Thinzar Wint Kyaw
Nan Su Yati Soe
Melody

See also
A Lan Zayar 2

References

2011 films
2010s Burmese-language films
Burmese romantic comedy films
Films shot in Myanmar
2011 romantic comedy films